Ine-Marí Venter (born 21 April 1995) is a South African netball player in the Suncorp Super Netball league, playing for the Queensland Firebirds.

Career
Venter began her netball career playing for the Gauteng Jaguars in the South African Brutal Fruit Netball Cup. She was quickly selected for the South African senior national team, having previously represented the under-19 national team as early as 2014. Venter was spotted by Melbourne Vixens head coach Simone McKinnis whilst representing South Africa at the 2018 Commonwealth Games and later that year she was signed by the Vixens for the 2019 season. Venter made three appearances for the Vixens before being signed to the Queensland Firebirds ahead of the 2020 season.

References

External links
 Netball Draft Central profile

1995 births
South African netball players
Melbourne Vixens players
Living people
2019 Netball World Cup players
South African expatriate netball people in Australia
Suncorp Super Netball players
Queensland Firebirds players
Sportspeople from Pretoria